Chloroclystis pallidiplaga, the white-shouldered pug, is a moth of the  family Geometridae. It is endemic to Australia.

Description
This moth is typical of the genus, featuring a mottled brown pattern with cross lines. In most specimens white patches occur at the forewing tip, and at the wing shoulder, hence the species epithet pallidiplaga ("pale area"). In the most well marked specimens white colouration extends onto the first half of the abdomen as well. Duller specimens are similar to other genus members, and may not be separable without dissection.

References

External links
Australian Faunal Directory

Moths described in 1898
Moths of Australia
pallidiplaga